Michael DiMercurio is an author of submarine fiction novels.  DiMercurio was a 1980 honors graduate of the U.S. Naval Academy with a B.S. in mechanical engineering, a 1981 National Science Foundation Scholarship fellow at MIT with a master's degree in mechanical engineering, and an officer in the U.S. Navy’s attack submarine force.  DiMercurio served aboard the fast attack nuclear submarine USS Hammerhead from 1982 to 1985 as communications officer, electrical officer and main propulsion assistant,.  After sea duty, DiMercurio was an instructor at Annapolis in the Naval Systems Engineering Department, then went on to civilian industry as a project manager in chemical and power plant engineering and construction.

DiMercurio's writings have appeared in Military.com

Bibliography
The Complete Idiot’s Guide to Submarines (coauthor)
Voyage of the Devilfish (1992)
Attack of the Seawolf (1993)
Phoenix Sub Zero (1994)
Barracuda Final Bearing (1996)
Piranha Firing Point (1999)
Threat Vector (2000)
Terminal Run (2002)
Emergency Deep (2004)
Vertical Dive (2005)
Dark Transit (2021)

References

External links
FORMER Official website (now obsolete)
Behind the mind of Michael DiMercurio - Interview
Piranha Firing Point - Subsim Interview With Michael DiMercurio

20th-century American novelists
Living people
United States Naval Academy alumni
21st-century American novelists
American male novelists
20th-century American male writers
21st-century American male writers
Year of birth missing (living people)